The Haus des Deutschen Sports, part of the larger Deutsches Sportforum, is a sporting venue constructed for the 1936 Summer Olympics in Berlin, Germany. Located in Olympiapark Berlin to the northeast of the Olympic Stadium, it hosted the fencing events and the fencing part of the modern pentathlon event.

References 
 1936 Summer Olympics official report Volume 1. pp. 163–4.
 1936 Summer Olympics official report Volume 2. pp. 752–815, 830–6.

Venues of the 1936 Summer Olympics
Olympic fencing venues
Olympic modern pentathlon venues
Sports venues in Berlin
Indoor arenas in Germany